Gilgit is a city in northern Pakistan

Gilgit may refer to other terms related with the area of the city:
 Gilgit River
 Gilgit Valley
 Gilgit District
 Gilgit Division
 Gilgit Agency (former administrative region of British India and of Pakistan)
 Gilgit Airport

See also
 Gilgit-Baltistan, formerly known as the Northern Areas, is the northernmost administrative territory in Pakistan